The fourth season of The Great Canadian Baking Show premiered on CBC Television on February 14, 2021. As with previous seasons, ten amateur bakers will compete over eight weeks of challenges, vying for the title. The season marked the debut of Ann Pornel and Alan Shane Lewis as hosts, who replaced Carolyn Taylor and Aurora Browne. Bruno Feldeisen and Kyla Kennaley returned for their fourth and second seasons respectively as judges.

Bakers

Results summary

Episodes
 Baker eliminated
 Star Baker
 Winner

Episode 1: Cake
For their first signature challenge, the bakers were given one hour and forty-five minutes to create a bundt cake that was topped with either a complementary glaze or drizzle. For the technical challenge, the bakers had to make a cupid cake -- a vertically-striped red velvet cake with a Swiss meringue buttercream icing, topped with tempered ruby chocolate decorations -- in two hours. For the showstopper, the bakers had three and a half hours to create a mirror glaze cake; their cake could be in whatever flavour they wanted, but the cake had to be multi-tiered to allow the mirror glaze to cascade down the cake.

Episode 2: Bread
For the signature challenge, the bakers had two and a half hours to create a tarte tropézienne, along with a complementary cream filling. The bakers were asked by Kyla in the technical challenge to bake one dozen soft pretzels, along with a complementary zesty cheese dip, in two and a half hours. For the showstopper, the bakers were to make a two-tiered bread centrepiece that showcased at least two different types of bread in four hours.

Episode 3: Cookies
The signature challenge saw the bakers bake 18 identical Linzer cookies in 90 minutes. For this week's technical, Bruno set the bakers the challenge of making 12 stroopwafels in 1 hour 45 minutes. In the showstopper challenge, the bakers were given 3 and a half hours to create a family portrait cookie sculpture. The sculpture could be either two- or three-dimensional, but it had to be made of at least two types of cookies and it had to incorporate the use of royal icing.

Episode 4: Italian
The bakers, in this week's Signature challenge, had to create 24 biscotti in two different flavours in 1 hour 30 minutes. The Technical challenge required the bakers to make 12 Italian puff pastry cream horns, also known as cannoncini, in 3 hours 15 minutes, the program's longest technical challenge ever. For the Showstopper challenge, the bakers had 4 hours to create a tower at least 3 feet tall made of at least three different sweet or savoury Italian treats.

Episode 5: Botanical
For the first ever botanical Signature challenge, the bakers were given 2 hours to make 8 mini fruit tarts, using any combination of custard, pastry cream, frangipane, and fruit that they wanted. In the Technical challenge, set by Kyla, the bakers had 1 hour 45 minutes to cook 16 pan-fried herb garden dumplings, along with an accompanying scallion sauce. The two-toned dumpling wrappers were made of two doughs combined together, with one dough the traditional white colour and the other tinted green with spinach juice. For the Showstopper challenge, the bakers had 4 hours to create a two-tier cake that showcased the week's theme: the cake had to incorporate a botanical element, and the bakers had to demonstrate their decorating skills by making handmade, edible flowers (whether through buttercream, sugar paste, or the use of a palette knife) to adorn the cake.

Episode 6: Pastry
For the quarter-final Signature challenge, the bakers were tasked with mastering the art of strudel pastry dough, by creating a strudel that was at least 12 inches long, and filled with either a savoury or sweet component in two and a half hours. For the Technical challenge, bakers were given a pared-down recipe of a Bakewell tart -- a classic British tart consisting of a pâte sablée crust, raspberry jam, frangipane, two-toned icing with a feathered design, and topped with a half glacé cherry -- which they had to make in two and a half hours. The Showstopper challenge required the bakers to create a vegetable tart using at least three different types of colourful vegetables in two and a half hours.

Episode 7: Fancy Desserts
For the semi-final Signature challenge, the bakers had three hours to bake 12 mini entremets. The Technical challenge, set by Bruno,  saw the bakers make a passion chocolate charlotte in 2 hours 15 minutes; the cake contained six individual elements -- two mousses, a chocolate ladyfinger lining, a passion fruit gelée, chocolate passion fruit ganache, and chocolate cookie crumble -- which forced the bakers to closely follow the pared-down recipe, as well as their instincts, to ensure the elements were set on time. The penultimate Showstopper challenge featured the bakers making a meringue cake in three and a half hours; they could use either curd, custard or cream in any flavour between the meringue layers, but the meringue itself had to crunch when cut into to be served.

Episode 8: Finale
For the final Signature challenge of the season, the three finalists had two and a half hours to create a bombe, which had to feature at least two different types of ice cream on top of a sponge cake base. For the final Technical challenge, the bakers had two hours forty-five minutes to create a gâteau St-Honoré, a classic French cake which forced the bakers to demonstrate their mastery of puff, choux pastry and crème Chiboust, all while working with a heavily pared-down recipe. For the final Showstopper, the bakers had four and a half hours to create a treat trolley, which had to consist of one picturesque pie, six mini cakes, six viennoiseries and eight elegant cookies, for a total of 21 items.

References

3
2021 Canadian television seasons
Television productions postponed due to the COVID-19 pandemic